Miroslav Štefanka (born September 23, 1973) is a Slovak professional ice hockey player who played with HC Slovan Bratislava in the Slovak Extraliga.

Career statistics

References

External links 

Living people
1973 births
HC Bílí Tygři Liberec players
HC Nové Zámky players
HC Slovan Bratislava players
HK Nitra players
HK Poprad players
HK Trnava players
Slovak ice hockey centres
Sportspeople from Nitra
Slovak expatriate ice hockey players in the Czech Republic
Slovak expatriate sportspeople in South Korea
Slovak expatriate sportspeople in Romania
Expatriate ice hockey players in South Korea
Expatriate ice hockey players in Romania